Gediz is a town and district of Kütahya Province in the Aegean region of Turkey. According to 2000 census, population of the district is 77,483 of which 19,375 live in the town of Gediz.

Environment
The area was described, in 1920, as having expansive oak forests.

History
From 1867 until 1922, Gediz was part of Hüdavendigâr vilayet.

See also 
 1970 Gediz earthquake

Notes

References

External links
 District governor's official website 

Populated places in Kütahya Province
Districts of Kütahya Province